William de York was a medieval Bishop of Salisbury.

William was provost of Beverley as well as holding prebends in the dioceses of Lincoln, London, and York. He was also a royal justice. He was elected on 8 or 10 December 1246 and consecrated on 7 or 14 July 1247. He died on either 25 January or 31 January in 1256.

Citations

References

 British History Online Bishops of Salisbury accessed on 30 October 2007
 

Bishops of Salisbury
13th-century English Roman Catholic bishops
1256 deaths
Year of birth unknown